Arpita is an Indian name for a female.
In Hindi, it means dedication to the divine (God). Some devote flowers to God, their service to the poor and even devote their complete lives to a cause or belief.

The name 'Arpita (girls)', 'Arpit (boys)',  implies complete devotion to something, usually but not exclusively to God. Arpita means one who is completely devoted/dedicated to someone (generally god).

The name is quite popular in Bihar and Jharkhand. The name Arpita is also very familiar among Bengalis . It means perfect and the one whose always right.

The name Arpita resembles beauty and wisdom at their highest and truest forms.

Indian feminine given names